Marcellus Community Schools is a Michigan school district encompassing all of the Village of Marcellus, Michigan, Marcellus Township, and the outlying areas.  It is located in Southwest Michigan in Cass County. Parts of the district reach into Van Buren and St. Joseph Counties.

Schools

Secondary
The Marcellus Middle/High school houses Grades 7-12
The Volinia Outcome School houses Grades 7-12 (Alternative High School/Adult High School for at risk students)

Elementary
The Elementary school houses grades K-6.

References

External links
 Official Website
 mhsaa.com

School districts in Michigan
Education in Cass County, Michigan